Avelal is a civil parish in the municipality of Sátão, Portugal. The population in 2011 was 529, in an area of 6.81 km2.

References

Freguesias of Sátão